Visa requirements for Zambian citizens are administrative entry restrictions by the authorities of other states placed on citizens of Zambia. As of 2 July 2019, Zambian citizens had visa-free or visa on arrival access to 69 countries and territories, ranking the Zambian passport 75th in terms of travel freedom according to the Henley Passport Index.

Visa requirements

Dependent, Disputed, or Restricted territories
Unrecognized or partially recognized countries

Dependent and autonomous territories

See also

Visa policy of Zambia
List of diplomatic missions in Zambia

References and Notes
References

Notes

Zambia
Foreign relations of Zambia